The Desire (Spanish:El deseo) is a 1944 Argentine drama film directed by Carlos Schlieper and starring Elsa O'Connor, Aída Luz and Roberto Airaldi.

The film's sets were designed by the art director Juan Manuel Concado.

Cast
 Elsa O'Connor as Juliana
 Aída Luz as Luisa
 Santiago Gómez Cou as Basilio
 Roberto Airaldi as Jorge	
 Pilar Gómez as Amiga de Juliana
 Homero Cárpena as Ernesto
 Darío Cossier as Reinaldo
 Delfy de Ortega as Leopoldina
 César Fiaschi as Señor juez
 Francisco López Silva		
 Edna Norrell 		 		
 Iris Portillo as Flora, la cocinera
 Susana Campos

References

Bibliography 
 Abel Posadas. Carlos Schlieper. Centro Editor de América Latina, 1994.

External links 
 

1944 films
1944 drama films
Argentine drama films
1940s Spanish-language films
Films directed by Carlos Schlieper
Argentine black-and-white films
1940s Argentine films